Hearts in Conflict is a 1912 American romantic drama film directed by Edward LeSaint. It was produced by the Independent Moving Pictures (IMP) Company of New York.

Cast
Harry A. Pollard - Ralph
Margarita Fischer - Angelina
Gretchen Lederer - Elinor
Gordon Sackville - Andrew
Gertrude Short - Jeanne
William Bertram - David

References

External links
 

1912 films
American romantic drama films
American silent short films
American black-and-white films
1912 short films
Films directed by Edward LeSaint
1912 romantic drama films
1910s American films
Silent romantic drama films
Silent American drama films